Berkeley Codd, also spelled Barclay (c. 1671 – 1740) was an American judge who served as a justice on the Colonial Delaware Supreme Court from 1710 until at least 1723.

Born in Maryland, c. 1671, to Colonel St. Leger Codd, he settled in Delaware and was a resident of Cedar Creek Hundred. He was appointed as a justice of the Delaware Supreme Court on April 11, 1710, and served in that position until at least 1723. He died in 1740.

References

1670s births
1740 deaths
Justices of the Delaware Supreme Court

1671 births